Ľubomír Sekeráš (born November 18, 1968) is a Slovak former professional ice hockey player. Sekeráš last played with hometown team HC Dukla Trenčín of the Slovak Extraliga. Sekeráš has played in the National Hockey League (NHL) with the Minnesota Wild and Dallas Stars.

Playing career
He started his career with the HC Dukla Trenčín of the then Czechoslovak Extraliga. After the Dissolution of Czechoslovakia in 1993, he continued to play for Dukla Trenčín, but in the Slovak Extraliga winning the Championship in its first season. He continued playing for Dukla Trenčín until 1995. At the start of the 1995-96 season, he began to play for HC Oceláři Třinec of the Czech Extraliga, which he would play for until the end of the 1999-00 season.

Sekeráš was drafted, at the age of 31, in the 8th round (232nd overall) by the Minnesota Wild of the 2000 NHL Entry Draft. He played immediately as part of the expansion team's inaugural 2000–01 season. He continued to play for the Wild through the 2003 playoffs scoring his first playoff goal, a game winner, in the turning point over the Vancouver Canucks in the Conference Semifinals. The Wild continued to make an unexpected run deep into the playoffs until they were eliminated by the Mighty Ducks of Anaheim in the Western Conference Finals.

A free agent in the 2003–04 season, Sekeráš signed with Lokomotiv Yaroslavl of the Russian Superleague. Lubomir left after 15 games to join Södertälje SK of the Swedish Elite League. Sekeráš whirlwind year continued when he was signed by the injury depleted Dallas Stars on March 9, 2004, to fill in for the remainder of the season. Sekeras played for the Nürnberg Ice Tigers of the German Hockey League in 2004–05, and returned to Sweden in 2006–07, when he played for Malmö Redhawks.

Career statistics

Regular season and playoffs

International

References

External links
 

1968 births
Living people
Czechoslovak ice hockey defencemen
Dallas Stars players
HC Oceláři Třinec players
HK Dukla Trenčín players
Ice hockey players at the 1994 Winter Olympics
Ice hockey players at the 1998 Winter Olympics
Lokomotiv Yaroslavl players
Malmö Redhawks players
Minnesota Wild draft picks
Minnesota Wild players
Nürnberg Ice Tigers players
Olympic ice hockey players of Slovakia
PSG Berani Zlín players
Slovak expatriate ice hockey players in Germany
Slovak ice hockey defencemen
Södertälje SK players
Sportspeople from Trenčín
Slovak expatriate ice hockey players in Russia
Slovak expatriate ice hockey players in the United States
Slovak expatriate ice hockey players in the Czech Republic
Slovak expatriate ice hockey players in Sweden